Guinobatan, officially the Municipality of Guinobatan, is a 1st class municipality in the province of Albay, Philippines. According to the 2020 census, it has a population of 85,786 people.

The town is the birthplace of General Simeón Ola, the last Filipino general to surrender to the Americans after the Philippine–American War.

History

Legend

In the research work "Guinobatan Through the Times," the following version of the legend is stated:
 In a region on Mayon's slopes lay a village. It was dotted with huts whose roofs were made of nipa, as well as with a number of stone houses. In the village was a church, and inside the belfry was a Golden Bell. So great was the bell that when rung, the sound could be heard from miles away. The sound could even reach the land of the Moros. The Moros, made curious by the sound of the bell, sent spies so that they would know what kind of bell was producing so loud and peculiar a sound. The spies were amazed and surprised to find out that the townspeople rang was made of pure gold. They went back to the land of the Moros eager to report their findings to their superiors. Motivated by greed, the Moros assembled a squad to plunder the bell. When they arrived at the village, they pillaged the community and torched houses. They attempted to force the people to tell them where the Golden Bell was. Their attempts failed. Many were still able to flee. The fleeing townsfolk knew where the bell was, and they hid the bell underneath the roots of trees. However, an old man was left in the village. Ashe was the only person left in the town; Moros tortured him so that he would tell the raiders where the Golden Bell was. The old man, however, did not know. Finding no use for the old man, the Moros killed him. They tried to pursue the townspeople, but they were too far away to be captured. Instead, they went to the woods in search of the Golden Bell. They uprooted every tree underneath which they believed the Golden Bell was hidden. Their efforts proved futile. Hence, with empty hands the Moros went back to their land, while the townspeople went back to the village to rebuild their lives, which had always been under threat from Moro pillagers and natural calamities; from bad harvests and oppressive encomienderos. The townspeople also kept the valued Golden Bell safe from anyone who tried to steal it. Seeing the uprooted trees, the townsfolk named their area “Guinobatan” meaning “a place where trees were uprooted.” So ends the legend.

Some versions also state that the town's name is derived from Ginabutan, meaning "a place where trees or plants were uprooted."

History under foreign rule
Luis Née, a botanist, reached Bicol in January 1792, accompanying the expedition of Capt. Alejandro Malaspina. Née explored towns near Mayon and including the area now known as Guinobatan. He noted that "trees grew in exuberance making the foothills impenetrable in many parts."

Dr. Leonilo Palacio of Guinobatan's Republic Colleges mentioned in an essay entitled "Guinobatan and its Church" that "in 1672, the Parish of Guinobatan was already mentioned in books as a visita of the Municipality of Camalig."

In 1890, the title of the gobernadorcillo was changed to Capitan Municipal. The Municipal Law of 1894 guaranteed that the term of the local executive would be extended from two years to four years. Also among the salient provisions of the law was the election of 12 vocales, equivalent to today's councilors. In 1895, the Colegio de San Buenaventura was also built, making Guinobatan the centre for higher education in Albay.

Cabezas and principales elected the gobernadorcillo until 1863. Until 1847, Guinobatan belonged to Camarines. During the said year, the towns of Quipia, Camalig and Donsol (now in Sorsogon) were ceded to Albay, in exchange for the towns of the Partido de Lagonoy. From 1730 to 1818, the town transferred from one place to another. In 1730, it was on a site now called Binanuahan. From there, it was the relocated to Bubulusan. During the eruption of 1814, citizens opted to evacuate to higher ground, in Mauraro.

American colonization
During the Philippine Revolution and the Philippine–American War (1898-1911), most of the schoolhouses built by the Spaniards were destroyed by constant artillery fire, most of which came from the Americans. As part of the "pacification" campaign of the Americans, engineers and architects were sent to the Philippines to oversee the construction of public works. Engr. Edward K. Bourne and famed urban planner Daniel Burnham, among other American architects and engineers, were instructed to go to Manila. In response, the Philippine Commission passed Act No. 268 which created the Bureau of Architecture and Construction of Public Buildings. Mr. Bourne was appointed as its head. In 1907, the Philippine Assembly was formed. Angel Roco of Mauraro, Guinobatan represented Albay in the Assembly. The same year, Assemblyman Isauro Gabaldon of Nueva Ecija authored an act which appropriated  1 million between 1907 and 1915 for "construction of schoolhouses of strong materials in barrios with guaranteed daily attendance of not less than sixty pupils…" Passing into law as Act No. 1801, the act became known as the "Gabaldon Act". Among the salient provisions was that no school could receive more than  4,000 unless the municipality to which the school belonged contributed at least 50% of the total amount granted to the school by the Gabaldon Act. The Gabaldon Act stipulated that only on land owned by the municipality could schools be constructed. Fifty-one "Gabaldons" were completed by 1911, and by 1916, four hundred five more were constructed. Among those completed between 1911 and 1916 was Guinobatan Central School blg. 1 or the Guinobatan East Central School's Gabaldon Building.

Potenciano Gregorio's Bikol language musical composition "Sarung Banggi" premiered at the town fiesta in Guinobatan in August 1910.

Geography
According to the Philippine Statistics Authority, the municipality has a land area of  constituting  of the  total area of Albay.

The territory of Guinobatan is bordered by a number of municipalities: Camalig on the east, Jovellar on the south, Pio Duran on the south-west, Ligao on the north-west. On the north-east, the town shares with Malilipot, Santo Domingo, Daraga, Tabaco and Legazpi, a common point in the crater of Mayon Volcano.

Barangays
Guinobatan is politically subdivided into 44 barangays.

Climate

Demographics

In the 2020 census, Guinobatan had a population of 85,786.

Economy

Culture
Guinobatan hosts an annual festival in the celebration of Our Lady of Assumption, its patron saint. Until 2013, the town festival was called "Arandurugan Festival." In August 2013, Guinobatan celebrated Longganisa Festival, named after the local product which is listed under the Department of Trade and Industry's "One Town, One Product" program.

References

External links
 [ Philippine Standard Geographic Code]

Municipalities of Albay